Riho Sibul (26 June 1958 – 20 November 2022) was an Estonian singer and guitarist of the rock band Ultima Thule.

He received the Order of the White Star, 5th. Class.

Sibul died on 20 November 2022, at the age of 64.

External links

Review: Riho Sibul (2000)

References

1958 births
2022 deaths
20th-century Estonian male singers
Estonian rock guitarists
Estonian rock singers
21st-century Estonian male singers
People from Rapla
Recipients of the Order of the White Star, 5th Class